Chemellier is a former commune in the Maine-et-Loire department of western France. On 15 December 2016, it was merged into the new commune Brissac Loire Aubance. It is around 15 km south-east of Angers.

See also
 Communes of the Maine-et-Loire department

References

Former communes of Maine-et-Loire